KVFC (740 AM) is a radio station in Cortez, Colorado broadcasting a News Talk Information format.  KVFC was among the first radio stations in the Four Corners Region, first licensed in 1955 to Cortez businessman Jack Hawkins.  Today, KVFC-AM is located on Hawkins Street in Cortez, named after the station's founder. The station is currently owned by Winton Road Broadcasting, Co.  and carries a weekday line-up of Rush Limbaugh, Laura Ingraham, Sean Hannity, Bill O'Reilly and Neal Boortz, among others. It currently simulcasts with KENN (AM) in Farmington, New Mexico.

740 AM is a Canadian clear-channel frequency, on which CFZM in Toronto, Ontario is the dominant Class A station.

References

External links

 

VFC